Rovas is a Greek surname.
Notable people with this name include:

 Christos Rovas (1994), Greek professional footballer
 Nikos Rovas (1977), Greek former professional tennis player

References 

Greek-language surnames
Surnames